Icelandair is the flag carrier airline of Iceland, with its corporate head office on the property of Reykjavík Airport in the capital city Reykjavik. It is part of the Icelandair Group and operates to destinations on both sides of the Atlantic Ocean from its main hub at Keflavík International Airport. The geographical position of Iceland is convenient for one-stop transatlantic flights, which is one pillar of the airline's business strategy, along with traffic to, from, and within the country.

History

Flugfélag Íslands in the early decades 

Icelandair traces its roots back to 1937, when Flugfélag Akureyrar was founded in Akureyri on the north coast of Iceland. Flight operations started in 1938 with a single Waco YKS-7 configured as a floatplane. In 1939 the airline was grounded when this aircraft was destroyed in a capsizing accident. The company moved to Reykjavík, where it acquired another Waco aircraft and was relaunched in 1940 as Flugfélag Íslands, which translates as Flight Company of Iceland. Previously, two unrelated airlines of the same name had existed in the country (from 1919 to 1920, and between 1928 and 1931). For international purposes, the name Iceland Airways was adopted.

The fleet was expanded with a Beechcraft Model 18 in 1942; and with two De Havilland Dragon Rapides and a Consolidated PBY Catalina in 1944, the latter being the first ever aircraft registered in Iceland to be flown to Iceland by an Icelandic crew from North America. On 11 July 1945, this aircraft operated the first commercial flight over the Atlantic Ocean for the airline, which led from Reykjavík to Largs in Scotland, with four passengers and four crew members on board. Regular flights to Prestwick Airport in Scotland and Copenhagen in Denmark, using Consolidated B-24 Liberator aircraft leased from Scottish Airlines were launched in 1946.

In the same year, the comfort and performance of domestic flights in Iceland could be improved with the introduction of the Douglas DC-3. A total of six were purchased, which remained in service with the airline until 1972. Until the late 1960s, Flugfélag concentrated mostly on domestic flights, where it initially faced fierce competition from Icelandic Airlines, another airline which had been founded in 1944. When a merger proposal from the Icelandic government was rejected by the two airlines, the domestic routes were split among them as a measure to ease competition. When Loftleiðir pulled out of the domestic market in 1952 to fully concentrate on international flights, Flugfélag became the main domestic carrier of the country.

International services stayed part of the business model of Flugfélag, though to a far lesser extent compared to Loftleiðir. In 1948, the Douglas DC-4 was introduced on those routes, and in 1957 two new Vickers 759 Viscounts were acquired, the first turboprop airliners to be operated by an Icelandic airline. In the 1950s, Flugfélag began to use the 'Icelandair' branding for its international flights.

In 1967, Flugfélag was the first Icelandic airline to join the jet age, when a Boeing 727-100 dubbed Gullfaxi was put into service. Another 727 was acquired in 1971, and the aircraft type was operated until 1990. In 2008, the cockpit section of Gullfaxi was put on display at the Akureyri Aviation Museum.

Loftleiðir 

Another company, Loftleiðir, called Icelandic Airlines internationally, had been formed in 1944 by three young pilots returning from their flight training in Canada. Their company, whose name roughly means "Skyways", concentrated on Icelandic domestic air services for the first few years. The first aircraft used were two Stinson Reliants, and then a Grumman G-21 Goose amphibious aircraft.

At first, Loftleiðir, like Flugfélag Íslands, concentrated on domestic air services. Loftleiðir began scheduled international operations in 1947.

By 1952, the Icelandic authorities were very worried that fierce competition between both Icelandic airlines would ruin both companies, and attempted to force a merger between them. This did not happen at the time, but instead the authorities split up the domestic routes between the two airlines. As a result, Loftleiðir ceased domestic flights in Iceland entirely, concentrating instead on international flights. Loftleiðir's pioneering low-fare services across the North Atlantic then commenced in 1953. In a way, Loftleiðir can even be considered a sort of precursor of the low-cost carriers that started popping up all over the globe in the 1970s, in particular the long-haul budget carrier like Norwegian Air Shuttle. This made it a popular airline for travel between Europe and North America.

The late 1960s were an exciting time for Loftleiðir. In 1969 the company acquired International Air Bahama, a small airline operating Douglas DC-8 jet aircraft out of the Bahamas with transatlantic nonstop service between Nassau and Luxembourg, and a year later Loftleiðir became one of the founders of Cargolux, a cargo airline. Also in 1970, Loftleiðir entered the jet age with its first two Douglas DC-8 aircraft.

During those years, Loftleiðir was often referred to, even by the company's staff, as "the Hippie Airline" or even "the Hippie Express". Loftleiðir was not famous for speed or punctuality, but flying with the company became a sort of rite of passage for young "hippies" from America travelling to Europe, one of whom was future president of the United States Bill Clinton.

Merger with Loftleiðir 
During the 1970s energy crisis, the economic situation for both Flugfélag Íslands and Loftleiðir worsened. The government of Iceland initiated a new attempt to merge the two airlines, which could be realized in 1973 following lengthy and difficult negotiations. In 1975, the Icelandic government provided a $13.5 million loan to Flugleiðir. The staff of Loftleiðir complained that Flugfélag Íslands, although smaller, had gained the upper hand in the united company. A holding company called Flugleiðir was created, which combined the two companies and began to streamline staff and operations. At the time of the merger, two-thirds of the passenger traffic of the airline were international transatlantic crossings, and Flugfélag Íslands's fleet of Douglas DC-3s and Boeing 727s were enlarged by the Douglas DC-8s of Loftleiðir. In 1979, the two airlines Flugfélag Íslands and Loftleiðir merged into one airline Flugleiðir, and the airline was renamed Icelandair.

Post-merger Icelandair 

In 1980, the Icelandic government provided a loan to Icelandair due to the company's bad financial situation.

The aircraft fleet of Icelandair remained mainly unchanged until the Boeing 757-200 became the new backbone for transatlantic flights during the 1990s. The domestic Fokker F27s were replaced by Fokker 50s and Boeing 737s deployed on European routes. The European hub at Luxembourg Airport had been taken over from Loftleiðir. Passenger count topped one million in 1997 as the company's business grew on a reputation as a "backpacker airline", similar to Loftleiðir, which had been referred to as "Hippie Airline" since the late 1960s. In the same year, it was begun to dismantle the Luxembourg hub in favour of today's decentralized European network, linking the largest cities non-stop to Reykjavík, closing it down altogether by 1999.

In 1997 the domestic operations of Icelandair, part of which had previously been operated under the 'Flugfélag Nordurlands' branding, were combined with a small airline Nordurflug to form the Air Iceland Connect subsidiary, allowing mainline Icelandair to fully concentrate on international flights since then. On 20 November 1999, a new aircraft livery was introduced, as part of an image campaign designed to retire Icelandair's "backpacker" label in favour of an emphasis on business travel. In 2001, the Icelandair hub was moved to Keflavík International Airport. As Icelandair particularly focuses on flights to North America, the company was significantly affected by the airspace closure following the September 11 attacks in the same year.

The Flugleiðir holding was reorganized as Icelandair Group (for aviation business) and FL Group (for non-aviation finance and investment business) between 2002 and 2005, with Icelandair becoming the largest and most important of eleven subsidiaries. The wet-lease and charter department, which was founded in 2003, was named Loftleiðir Icelandic, thus re-introducing a familiar name.

Developments since 2010 
Like most Icelandic companies, Icelandair was hit quite hard by the 2008 financial crisis in the country but was well on the road to recovery when another crisis of a very different kind hit in 2010. The air traffic restrictions following the 2010 eruptions of Eyjafjallajökull resulted in large parts of the European airspace being closed down. The air travel disruption coincided with the start of the important summer season for the company. The in-house crisis management organisation began assessing the situation once the scale of the problem had become known. Thrice-daily crisis meetings were held at the airline's headquarters. Icelandair tried to operate as many passenger flights as possible, keeping its hub at Keflavík open and diverting European flights to airports that were still open. The eventual closure of Keflavík due to the volcanic ash cloud coincided with an improvement of the situation towards Europe, which allowed Icelandair to move its headquarters with 200 staff to Glasgow and operate flights from there for ten days, with shuttle flights to Iceland's Akureyri Airport and round-the-clock bus shuttles onwards to Reykjavík.

In the aftermath of the eruption, the government of Iceland launched the successful "Inspired by Iceland" campaign to regain confidence in travelling to Iceland for tourists and business people, of which Icelandair was a leading participant and initiator.

When the Grímsvötn volcano erupted in 2011, Icelandair once again had to cope with airspace closures in Europe. However, this time to a lesser extent due to a higher level of political preparedness. Weekly newspaper The Economist claimed that Icelandair could even take advantage when catering for disaster tourists.

In February 2011 Icelandair was chosen "The Knowledge Company" of the year and Icelandair CEO Birkir Hólm Guðnason was picked as "Man of the Year" in the Icelandic business community. In both categories the panel of judges of the Association of Economists and Business Graduates in Iceland said that "the fine results of the company in the previous year showed both a high degree of skill and specialist knowledge within the company as well as excellent leadership." In October of the same year, the airline was awarded the title "Marketing Firm of the Year in Iceland", by a judging panel from IMARK, the Marketing Association in Iceland.

Further route expansion 

After having launched scheduled flights to Washington, D.C., in 2011, Denver was announced as a new U.S. destination for 2012, followed by Anchorage in 2013, bringing the total number of cities served in the country up to eight, along with Boston, Minneapolis, New York City, Orlando and Seattle. Also in 2012, Icelandair resumed domestic services, with regular flights linking Akureyri to its Keflavík hub through subsidiary company Air Iceland.

From 2009 to 2014, operations doubled. New destinations in 2014 were Edmonton and Vancouver in Canada; and Geneva. Twice-weekly flights to Vancouver commenced on 13 May 2014 and continued until October of that year. Flights to Edmonton started on 4 March 2014, with a year-round service operating five times a week. The Geneva service started on 24 May 2014 and continued twice weekly until September.

On 9 December 2014, Icelandair revealed a northern lights-themed Boeing 757-200 (registration TF-FIU) named Hekla Aurora. The aircraft was officially launched in February 2015 as part of the company's #MyStopover campaign. The exterior, which was hand-painted by a team of highly skilled airbrush artists from the UK, features artwork depicting an Icelandic winter scene complete with the Aurora Borealis. An installation of LED mood lighting in the cabin continues the theme by emulating both the colours and dancing patterns of the aurora. As part of Icelandair's transatlantic fleet, the Hekla Aurora began operating to all of Icelandair's destinations at the time, and has a three-day advance schedule available for passengers and observers.

On 5 February 2015, Birmingham became Icelandair's 5th gateway in the UK, and the 39th overall, with flights operating twice weekly, on Thursdays and Mondays. On 19 May 2015, Icelandair launched scheduled flights to and from Portland, Oregon in the US: its 14th destination in North America. Flights were set to operate twice weekly, on Tuesdays and Thursdays, until 20 October. Further expansion of Icelandair's global network was announced on 12 May 2015 with new, year-round services from Chicago O’Hare International Airport. Services commenced on 16 March 2016, with flights to Iceland operating four days a week. On 17 August 2015 Icelandair announced the augmentation of its global flight network with a new service between Keflavik and Aberdeen, the company's second Scottish destination. The new service, operated by Air Iceland Connect (a subsidiary of Icelandair Group), commenced in March of the following year, with flights scheduled four times per week.

Icelandair commenced scheduled flights to Paris Orly Airport beginning on 29 March 2016. Services to Montreal Airport began on 26 May 2016. In September 2016, Icelandair announced services to Philadelphia, US, starting in May 2017 and Tampa, US starting in Sep 2017.

In May 2017, Icelandair unveiled a glacier-themed special livery on Boeing 757-200 (registration TF-FIR) named Vatnajökull, the name of Europe's largest glacier.  The special livery was created to commemorate Icelandair's 80th anniversary. In August 2017, Icelandair announced service five days per week to Cleveland, US, which began on 16 May 2018. The route was cut in early 2019. In August 2017, the Cape Verdean government signed an agreement with Icelandic Airlines, part of the Icelandair Group, which turned the administration of TACV to the Icelandic group. The new administration plans include discontinuing the hub at Praia International Airport focusing all of the airline's operations at Amílcar Cabral International Airport and from there serving as a connecting hub between the Americas, Europe and Africa. On 5 November 2017, the company Icelandair (the new TACV administrator) passed the first Boeing 757-200 to TACV to reinforce existing routes, such as daily flights to Lisbon, Fortaleza and Recife (which increases to 4 weekly flights as of 3 December).

Since the 1960s, Icelandair has offered passengers travelling on transatlantic flights between North America and Europe an opportunity to stopover in Iceland for up to seven days, at no additional cost. To raise awareness about its stopover offer, the company launched a new social media initiative in 2014, with the hashtag #MyStopover.

On 9 January 2018, Icelandair announced that it would provide three non-stop flights a week from Kansas City International Airport to Keflavík International Airport, which commenced on 25 May 2018. Icelandair commenced four weekly flights to and from Dallas Ft. Worth on 30 May 2018. It ended on 6 March 2019. On 5 November 2018, Icelandair announced plans to take over its low-cost competitor, WOW Air, with the two airlines to be operated as separate brands. On 29 November, Icelandair abandoned this endeavour as the shareholders’ meeting pre-conditions were unlikely to be met.

On 18 September 2020, the company´s share capital was increased with the issue of 23,000,000,000 new shares with a nominal value of 1 Icelandic króna following a public share offering. In addition, the Icelandic government decided to guarantee a line of credit for Icelandair. The guarantee amounts to $120 million.

On 9 March 2021, Icelandair Group announced that Air Iceland Connect is to merge with Icelandair by uniting domestic and international services from 16 March 2021 and continuing the current flight operations under the Icelandair brand.

Inflight service 
Icelandair offers three booking classes: Economy Light, Economy, and Saga Class (the last being equivalent to the Business class). Free meals are only available in Saga Class, and a buy on board service is provided for the Economy classes. The airline offered Economy Comfort until April 2018.

All of Icelandair's aircraft are equipped with a free-of-charge VOD in-flight entertainment system that includes seatback, and touch-screen monitors for each passenger. The airline claims to be especially children-friendly. Free meals, blankets, pillows and headsets are provided to children, and the inflight system hosts a selection of children's films.

Almost all of Icelandair's fleet is equipped with in-flight Wi-Fi, provided by Row 44 and Zodiac Inflight Innovations. The installation of Wi-Fi in all Boeing aircraft was completed.

Special assistance is provided for travelling with pets, young travellers and infants, and special service, for example for blind people with seeing-eye dogs, expectant mothers, wheelchair service, POC systems.

Icelandair Info, the inflight magazine of Icelandair, is printed four times a year in Icelandic and English. First published in 2008, it is also the product catalogue for the airline's Saga Shop.

On 1 April 2013 Icelandic band Sigur Rós debuted its latest album, Valtari, exclusively onboard Icelandair's aircraft, two months before the album's general release. Biophilia, Björk's 2011 album, had earlier been released on Icelandair's fleet in the same way.

Captain Ingvar Mar Jónsson flew a flight to Washington D.C., with the cabin crew consisting of his wife and their three daughters.

Frequent-flyer programme 
Icelandair's frequent-flyer programme is Saga Club, a programme where members can earn Saga points for travelling on Icelandair or partner airlines, and redeem points toward travel or Saga Shop inflight purchases. As of January 2021, Alaska Airlines and JetBlue are the only partner airlines of Icelandair eligible to earn Saga points through Saga Club, while Alaska Airlines is the only partner airline that allows for redeeming points towards travel.

Destinations 

Icelandair flies between Iceland and several destinations across Europe and North America. A few of these destinations are seasonal.

Codeshare agreements
Icelandair codeshares with the following airlines:
 airBaltic
 Alaska Airlines
 Finnair
 JetBlue
 Scandinavian Airlines

Fleet

Current fleet
, Icelandair operates a fleet of Boeing and De Havilland aircraft, with more Boeing aircraft on order. Most of the aircraft in Icelandair's fleet is named after Icelandic volcanoes.

Fleet development
In 2005, the airline, on behalf of its parent company Icelandair Group, announced an order for ten Boeing 737-800 aircraft with options for five more. Those options were later exercised. These were not placed into service by the airline but leased to other airlines. During that same year, Icelandair announced an order for two Boeing 787 Dreamliners. In 2006, Icelandair announced an order for two more Boeing 787s. In 2011, it was announced that orders for three of the 787s had been cancelled.

On 13 February 2013, Icelandair Group announced that the company had finalized an order with Boeing for sixteen new Boeing 737 MAX aircraft. Purchase rights for eight additional 737s had also been signed. The value for all sixteen aircraft was US$1.6 billion at Boeing list prices, but the actual purchase price was confidential. The aircraft will be delivered in 2018–2021. The order is for nine 737 MAX 8s configured for 153 passengers; and seven 737 MAX 9s to hold 172 passengers. In comparison, Icelandair Group's current Boeing 757-200 aircraft hold 183 passengers.

On 8 May 2019, Icelandair announced that the company was considering ordering the Airbus A321neo and Airbus A321LR as a replacement for their ageing fleet of Boeing 757s, or to run alongside their Boeing 737 MAX 8 or to even replace the MAX 8s entirely, due to the Boeing 737 MAX groundings.

On 22 January 2020 Icelandair announced that the airline would lease three Boeing 737-800 airliners to enter service in spring 2020. The aircraft were to be dry leased and flown by Icelandair pilots. However this never took place.

On 12 August 2020, Icelandair reached a settlement with Boeing over the MAX groundings. The settlement included reducing the carrier's order for future MAX aircraft by four.

Special liveries
As of September 2018, Icelandair operates three aircraft with special liveries. Two depict the natural beauty of Iceland. One showcases the largest glacier in Europe, Vatnajökull, as well as celebrates the independence of Iceland for 100 years. The other highlights the Aurora Borealis (Northern Lights), also part of Icelandair's #IcelandStopover campaign. The third aircraft (Boeing B757 TF-ISX "Þingvellir") is painted in the red, white, and blue livery of Iceland's flag and celebrates both the 100th anniversary of Icelandic National Sovereignty (1918-2018) and the National Men's Football Team's World Cup debut in 2018.

Historical fleet
Over the years, the airline operated the following aircraft types:

Icelandair Cargo

Overview

Icelandair Cargo is a sister airline to Icelandair; it is Icelandair Group's cargo airline subsidiary. Flugfélag Íslands and Loftleiðir used their aircraft to carry freight as well as passengers, and when Icelandair was established in 1973 a freight division was set up within the airline. After years of operating freighter aircraft as part of Icelandair, Icelandair Cargo was established as a separate entity in 2000. The airline uses available space in the baggage compartments of Icelandair's passenger aircraft, as well as operating two Boeing 757 freighters to destinations in Europe and North America from its base at Keflavík International Airport. 

In 2021, Icelandair Cargo announced Boeing 767-300ER passenger aircraft would be converted to freighters. The first converted 767-300BCF was delivered to Icelandair on 8 December 2022 with plans to use the increased capacity to establish new routes to the United States.

Fleet

, the Icelandair Cargo fleet consists of the following aircraft:

Iceland Airwaves 
As one of Iceland's largest companies, Icelandair sponsors many events and charities. The company is, together with the City of Reykjavík, one of two main sponsors of the immensely popular Iceland Airwaves, the annual music festival held in Reykjavík on the first weekend in November. The festival spans five days (Wednesday–Sunday) and its main focus is showcasing new music, both Icelandic and international.

Accidents and incidents 
29 May 1947 A Flugfélag Islands Douglas DC-3 (registered TF-ISI) crashed near Hjedinsfjordur during a scheduled domestic flight from Reykjavík to Akureyri, killing the 21 passengers and 4 crew on board. To date, this remains the worst aviation accident in Iceland.
7 March 1948 An Avro Anson Mk5 belonging to Loftleiðir crashed on the mountain Skálafell en route from the Westmann Islands (Vestmannaeyjar) to Reykjavík, killing the pilot and the five passengers on board.
31 January 1951 The seventeen passengers and three crew members on board a DC-3 registered TF-ISG were killed when the aircraft crashed in the sea off the Icelandic coast near Hafnarfjörður. The pilots were attempting to land the aircraft at Reykjavík Airport in heavy snowfalls following a flight from Vestmannaeyjar when radar contact was lost.
14 April 1963 A Vickers Viscount (registered TF-ISU) crashed on approach to Oslo-Fornebu Airport. All 12 people on board were killed.
26 September 1970 A Flugfélag Fokker F27 Friendship (registered TF-FIL) crashed into a mountain near Vágar, Faroe Islands while approaching Vágar Airport following a scheduled passenger flight from Bergen, in what is known as controlled flight into terrain. Of the 34 people on board, 7 passengers and 1 crew member were killed.
15 November 1978 Due to a fault in the ground-based instrument landing system transmitter, a Douglas DC-8 registered TF-FLA missed the runway while attempting to land at Colombo Airport in Sri Lanka during a chartered Hajj pilgrimage flight from Jeddah and crashed, killing 8 of the 13 Icelandic crew members, 5 reserve crew members and 170 (mostly Indonesian) Muslim pilgrims from South Borneo, out of a total of 262 passengers and crew (74 passengers and 5 crew members survived the accident). The disaster of Icelandic Airlines Flight LL 001 (a Loftleiðir flight number, but the company had merged with Flugfélag at that time) with its 183 fatalities marks by far the worst accident in the history of Icelandic aviation.
 22 January 2002
 The crew of Icelandair Flight 315, a Boeing 757-200 registered TF-FIO with 75 passengers on board, unintentionally entered a series of extreme manoeuvres during a go-around from a low altitude following an unstabilised approach into Oslo Airport, Gardermoen. During the incident the aircraft was subjected to load factors over the design limits, culminating in a dive followed by a +3.59 g pull-up manoeuvre clearing the ground by only 321 ft. The speed limit for the flap configuration was also exceeded. Control was regained and a second approach was flown with the aircraft landing safely. The airliner was permitted to proceed on its subsequent scheduled flights without a technical inspection being conducted until 13 March of that year when its manufacturer Boeing recommended further maintenance work after having evaluated the readings from the flight data recorder. The Accident Investigation Board Norway, which led the investigation into the incident, made four safety recommendations, including one to the wider aviation community on operational procedures regarding discontinued approaches.
7 February 2020 Icelandair flight 529, a Boeing 757-200 registered TF-FIA suffered a right-hand main landing gear collapse after landing on runway 10 at Keflavík International Airport, Iceland. There were no injuries among the 166 people on board.
28 September 2022
 A Korean Air plane collided into a Boeing 767 owned by Icelandair on the ground at London-Heathrow airport. There were no injuries.

References

External links 

 

 
Airlines of Iceland
Airlines established in 1937
Association of European Airlines members
Airlines for Europe
Companies based in Reykjavík
1937 establishments in Iceland
Icelandic brands